"Feel So Good" is the debut single by American hip-hop artist Mase. It was released in October 1997 through Arista Records and Puff Daddy's Bad Boy Records as the lead single from his debut album, Harlem World, and it appeared on the Money Talks soundtrack. The song was produced by D-Dot and Sean "Puffy" Combs and featured vocals by R&B singer Kelly Price on the chorus. The single was the most successful of the three singles released from the album, having peaked at number 5 on both the Billboard Hot 100 and the Hot R&B/Hip-Hop Songs, and number-one on the Hot Rap Singles chart. "Feel So Good" was certified gold just about a month after its release on November 12, 1997; it was later certified platinum by the Recording Industry Association of America (RIAA). Chris Tucker, 
Mase and Sean appears in the music video, which was directed by Hype Williams. They drive around the city in a Mercedes-Benz and a group of female dancers are also shown dancing with them.

The main sample the song uses is from Kool & the Gang's "Hollywood Swinging", and the chorus interpolates the Miami Sound Machine's "Bad Boy". Jay-Z interpolates the lyrics on the song "BBC" off his album Magna Carta Holy Grail.

Music video
The music video was filmed at Fremont Street in Las Vegas, Nevada. The music video was released for the week ending on October 12, 1997.

In popular culture
The song was used at the beginning of the Ms. Marvel episode "Crushed".

The song became the United States' goal song during the 2022 FIFA World Cup.

Charts

Weekly charts

Year-end charts

Certifications

References

1997 debut singles
1997 songs
Mase songs
Bad Boy Records singles
Arista Records singles
Music videos directed by Hype Williams
Songs written by Sean Combs
Songs written by Lawrence Dermer
Songs written by Mase
Songs written by Deric Angelettie